New Waterford is a village in northeastern Columbiana County, Ohio, United States. The population was 1,194 at the 2020 census.

History
New Waterford was laid out circa 1851.

In the 19th century, New Waterford contained sawmills and gristmills powered by the Big Bull Creek.

Geography
New Waterford is located at  (40.847654, -80.617113).

Demographics

2010 census
As of the census of 2010, there were 1,238 people, 513 households, and 348 families living in the village. The racial makeup of the village was 98.1% White, 0.2% African American, 0.2% Native American, 0.5% Asian, 0.1% from other races, and 0.9% from two or more races. Hispanic or Latino of any race were 0.6% of the population.

There were 513 households, of which 30.4% had children under the age of 18 living with them, 51.3% were married couples living together, 13.1% had a female householder with no husband present, 3.5% had a male householder with no wife present, and 32.2% were non-families. 29.0% of all households were made up of individuals, and 14.2% had someone living alone who was 65 years of age or older. The average household size was 2.41 and the average family size was 2.94.

The median age in the village was 40.1 years. 24% of residents were under the age of 18; 8.3% were between the ages of 18 and 24; 23.3% were from 25 to 44; 28.3% were from 45 to 64; and 16% were 65 years of age or older. The gender makeup of the village was 47.1% male and 52.9% female.

2000 census
As of the census of 2000, there were 1,391 people, 570 households, and 388 families living in the village. The population density was 1,564.0 people per square mile (603.4/km). There were 598 housing units at an average density of 672.4 per square mile (259.4/km). The racial makeup of the village was 98.78% White, 0.07% African American, 0.07% from other races, and 1.08% from two or more races. Hispanic or Latino of any race were 0.14% of the population.

There were 570 households, out of which 32.6% had children under the age of 18 living with them, 51.2% were married couples living together, 13.0% had a female householder with no husband present, and 31.8% were non-families. 28.6% of all households were made up of individuals, and 14.9% had someone living alone who was 65 years of age or older. The average household size was 2.44 and the average family size was 3.01.

In the village, the population was spread out, with 25.4% under the age of 18, 7.9% from 18 to 24, 27.9% from 25 to 44, 24.9% from 45 to 64, and 13.9% who were 65 years of age or older. The median age was 38 years. For every 100 females there were 92.7 males. For every 100 females age 18 and over, there were 85.5 males.

The median income for a household in the village was $35,000, and the median income for a family was $44,313. Males had a median income of $29,931 versus $17,813 for females. The per capita income for the village was $16,239. About 6.8% of families and 9.5% of the population were below the poverty line, including 11.3% of those under age 18 and 10.8% of those age 65 or over.

Government
New Waterford operates under a mayor–council government, where there are six council members elected as a legislature in addition to an independently elected mayor who serves as an executive. The current mayor is M. Shane Patrone.

Education
Children in New Waterford are served by the Crestview Local School District. The current schools in the district are:
 Crestview Elementary School – 3407 Middleton Road, grades PreK-4
 Crestview Middle School – 44100 Crestview Road, grades 5-8
 Crestview High School – 44100 Crestview Road, grades 9-12

References

Villages in Columbiana County, Ohio
Villages in Ohio
1851 establishments in Ohio
Populated places established in 1851